The Campeonato Brasileiro Série C 1995 was a football (soccer) series played from August 27 to December 10th, 1995. It was the third level of the Brazilian National League. The competition had 108 clubs, the largest number before or since (as of writing in 2014), and two of them were originally promoted to Série B. However, with the withdrawal of five teams after the 1995 Série B, the 3rd to 6th placed teams in the 1995 Série C were promoted to the 1996 Série B.

First phase

Group 1

Group 2

Group 3

Group 4

Group 5

Group 6

Group 7

Group 8

Group 9

Group 10

Group 11

Group 12

Group 13

Group 14

Group 15

Group 16

Group 17

Group 18

Group 19

Group 20

Group 21

Group 22

Group 23

Group 24

Group 25

Group 26

Group 27

Group 28

Group 29

Group 30

Group 31

Group 32

Second phase

Third phase

Round of 16

Quarterfinals

Semifinals

Finals

Sources

Campeonato Brasileiro Série C seasons
1995 in Brazilian football leagues